Starorechensky is a rural locality (a khutor) in Mikhaylovka Urban Okrug, Volgograd Oblast, Russia. The population was 181 as of 2010. There are 7 streets.

Geography 
Starorechensky is located 18 km southwest of Mikhaylovka. 1-y Ilmensky is the nearest rural locality.

References 

Rural localities in Mikhaylovka urban okrug